Róbert Szikszai (born 30 September 1994) is a Hungarian athlete specialising in the discus throw. He won bronze medals at the 2015 European U23 Championships and 2017 Summer Universiade.

His personal best in the event is 66.93m set in Pusztai László Sporttelep,Szentes in 2021.

International competitions

References

1994 births
Living people
Hungarian male discus throwers
Universiade bronze medalists for Hungary
Universiade medalists in athletics (track and field)
Hungarian Athletics Championships winners
Medalists at the 2017 Summer Universiade